Percy Edward Raymond (30 May 1879 – 17 May 1952) was a Harvard professor and paleontologist who specialized in the evolution of trilobites and studied fossils from the Burgess shales within which a region is named as the Raymond Quarry. He was among the careful explorers of the apparent explosion of life forms in the Cambrian period. 

Raymond was born in New Canaan, Connecticut, son of George Edward and Harriet Frances née Beers. He studied at Cornell University and although aiming to become an engineer, became fascinated by lectures of G.D. Harris. He then went on to study paleontology, receiving a Ph.D. from Yale in 1904 under the supervision of Charles Emerson Beecher. He worked at the Carnegie Museum, and the Geological Survey of Canada before becoming an assistant professor at Harvard University in 1910. He worked there until his retirement in 1945, continuing on as an emeritus professor. 

Raymond's major work was based on a rediscovery of the specimens in the Burgess Scale. The largest fossil collections had been made by Charles Doolittle Walcott and after his death in 1927, his collections, then thought to be exhaustive, were not allowed to be examined by his widow Mary Vaux Walcott. Raymond then re-examined the same region and found a major bed higher up which has been called the Raymond Quarry. Raymond examined trilobite evolution over time through morphology of specimens from various points in time. He especially looked at variations in the appendages and examined similarities with other groups including the insects, crustaceans and arachnids.

Raymond was a member of the Pewter Collectors' Club of America and a Fellow of the Geological Society of America. He received a Walker Grand Prize of the Boston Society of Natural History in 1928 for his monograph on the trilobites. He died at Mount Auburn Hospital, Lexington, at the age of 72 leaving his wife Eva Grace (née Goodenough) and daughter Ruth Elspeth.

References

External links 

 The appendages, anatomy and relationships of trilobites (1920)
 Prehistoric Life (1947)
 Biography

1879 births
1952 deaths
Yale University alumni
Harvard University faculty
American paleontologists